A Stranger in the Mirror is a 1976 novel written by Sidney Sheldon. The novel is one of the earliest of Sheldon's works, but contains the typical Sheldon fast-paced narration and several narrative techniques, with the exception of a twist ending. The novel tells the life story of two fictitious Hollywood celebrities - Toby Temple and Jill Castle (roman à clef on Sheldon's acquaintances Groucho Marx and Erin Fleming) and portrays the emotional extremes of success and failure and how people inevitably become victims of time. It was adapted into a television film in 1993 starring Perry King, Lori Loughlin, Christopher Plummer, and Juliet Mills.

Plot summary 
A retired captain recalls the cruise where he decided to retire, which involves the famous celebrity, Jill Castle. The book then goes back to the beginning of the lives of the two main characters: Jill and Toby Temple.

Toby's main influence growing up is his mother, who pushes him to always do better and leads him to believe he is destined for fame and greatness. After running away to Hollywood to avoid a shotgun marriage, his delusion of being naturally funny and charming is shattered when he struggles to start his career as a comedian. Eventually, after years of hardship, he becomes a successful star through the help of Clifton Lawrence, a celebrity producer, though he has become an egomaniac who destroys the careers of anyone with the slightest fault against him, and has to have everyone around him dependent on him, including Lawrence, whom he forces to drop all of his other celebrity clients.

Jill, born Josephine Czinski, leaves her hometown of Odessa, Texas for Hollywood after she learns that her boyfriend, the wealthy David Kenyon, is engaged to another woman, Cissy, the morning after he nearly proposed to Jill himself. In reality, David's mother and Cissy trick David into thinking it would be a temporary marriage just to please his mother, but he fails to tell Jill about this. She discovers the difficulty of being an actress with no connections and, after being drugged into participating in a pornographic film, decides to start earning better roles in exchange for sexual favors. After a failed attempt at reuniting with David, who misses their rendezvous after Cissy attempts to kill herself, Jill returns to Hollywood and ends up working for the Toby Temple Show.

Toby is attracted to Jill, unaware of her promiscuous reputation. They bond over their humble beginnings and Toby marries her, despite Lawrence's warnings. Jill manipulates Toby into destroying the careers of those who have used her in the past, and then ends Lawrence's career (since he refused her a meeting when she was an unknown) by becoming Toby's manager. Lawrence learns about Jill's porno film, but is unable to show it to Toby. Toby enjoys Jill's new role as his manager, seeing her resemblance to his mother, but he suffers a stroke that leaves him paralyzed with an estimated few years left to live. Jill's determination to help him and his miraculous improvement earns public approval, making her more famous than Toby. She reconnects with David, now a divorcé, and while they agree to be friends, she secretly loves him still. Toby relapses into another stroke, this time marring his appearance and paralyzing him completely, though this time he is estimated to live for another 20 years. In frustration, she tells a paralyzed Toby that she does not love him anymore but, as a result, begins to have nightmares about his moving eyes. She decides to drown him and stage his death as an accident, and while she is not charged with murder, Lawrence does not believe her story.

Lawrence hears of Jill's low-profile wedding to David Kenyon and suspects her of murdering Toby to be with him. He follows them to their honeymoon cruise and forces David to watch Jill's pornographic film. David's racist history is revealed, and he beats up Lawrence. David leaves on a helicopter, while Lawrence gloats about his victory to Jill. Jill, depressed, hallucinates and sees Toby's face in the water and hears his voice beckoning her to come to him. She jumps off the boat to be with him.

References

External links
 SidneySheldon.com | Bookshelf

 A Stranger in the Mirror at IMDb

1976 American novels
Novels by Sidney Sheldon